Charles Martel ( – 22 October 741) was a Frankish political and military leader who, as Duke and Prince of the Franks and Mayor of the Palace, was the de facto ruler of Francia from 718 until his death. He was a son of the Frankish statesman Pepin of Herstal and Pepin's mistress, a noblewoman named Alpaida. Charles, also known as "The Hammer" (in Old French, Martel), successfully asserted his claims to power as successor to his father as the power behind the throne in Frankish politics. Continuing and building on his father's work, he restored centralized government in Francia and began the series of military campaigns that re-established the Franks as the undisputed masters of all Gaul. According to a near-contemporary source, the Liber Historiae Francorum, Charles was "a warrior who was uncommonly ... effective in battle".

Martel gained a very consequential victory against an Umayyad invasion of Aquitaine at the Battle of Tours, at a time when the Umayyad Caliphate controlled most of the Iberian Peninsula. Alongside his military endeavours, Charles has been traditionally credited with a seminal role in the development of the Frankish system of feudalism.

At the end of his reign, Charles divided Francia between his sons, Carloman and Pepin. The latter became the first king of the Carolingian dynasty. Pepin's son Charlemagne, grandson of Charles, extended the Frankish realms and became the first emperor in the West since the fall of Rome.

Background 
Charles, nicknamed "Martel", or "Charles the Hammer" in later chronicles, was the illegitimate son of Pepin of Herstal and his mistress, possible second wife, Alpaida. He had a brother named Childebrand, who later became the Frankish dux (that is, duke) of Burgundy.

Older historiography commonly describes Charles as "illegitimate", but the dividing line between wives and concubines was not clear-cut in eighth-century Francia. It is likely that the accusation of "illegitimacy" derives from the desire of Pepin's first wife Plectrude to see her progeny as heirs to Pepin's power.

After the reign of Dagobert I (629–639) the Merovingians effectively ceded power to the Pippinid Mayors of the Palace, who ruled the Frankish realm of Austrasia in all but name. They controlled the royal treasury, dispensed patronage, and granted land and privileges in the name of the figurehead king. Charles' father, Pepin of Herstal, was able to unite the Frankish realm by conquering Neustria and Burgundy. Pepin was the first to call himself Duke and Prince of the Franks, a title later taken up by Charles.

Contesting for power 

In December 714, Pepin of Herstal died. A few months before his death and shortly after the murder of his son Grimoald the Younger, he had, at his wife Plectrude's urging, designated Theudoald, his grandson by their late son Grimoald, his heir in the entire realm. This was immediately opposed by the Austrasian nobles because Theudoald was a child of only eight years of age. To prevent Charles using this unrest to his own advantage, Plectrude had him imprisoned in Cologne, the city which was intended to be her capital. This prevented an uprising on his behalf in Austrasia, but not in Neustria.

Civil war of 715–718 

Pepin's death occasioned open conflict between his heirs and the Neustrian nobles who sought political independence from Austrasian control. In 715, Dagobert III named Ragenfrid mayor of their palace, effectively declaring political independence. On 26 September 715, Ragenfrid's Neustrians met the young Theudoald's forces at the Battle of Compiègne. Theudoald was defeated and fled back to Cologne.
Before the end of the year, Charles Martel had escaped from prison and been acclaimed mayor by the nobles of Austrasia. That same year, Dagobert III died and the Neustrians proclaimed Chilperic II, the cloistered son of Childeric II, as king.

Battle of Cologne 

In 716, Chilperic and Ragenfrid together led an army into Austrasia intent on seizing the Pippinid wealth at Cologne. The Neustrians allied with another invading force under Redbad, King of the Frisians and met Charles in battle near Cologne, which was still held by Plectrude. Charles had little time to gather men, or prepare, and the result was inevitable. The Frisians held off Charles, while the king and his mayor besieged Plectrude at Cologne, where she bought them off with a substantial portion of Pepin's treasure. After that they withdrew. The Battle of Cologne is the only defeat of Charles Martel's career.

Battle of Amblève 

Charles retreated to the hills of the Eifel to gather men, and train them. Having made the proper preparations, in April 716, he fell upon the triumphant army near Malmedy as it was returning to its own province. In the ensuing Battle of Amblève, Martel attacked as the enemy rested at midday. According to one source, he split his forces into several groups which fell at them from many sides. Another suggests that while this was his intention, he then decided, given the enemy's unpreparedness, this was not necessary. In any event, the suddenness of the assault led them to believe they were facing a much larger host. Many of the enemy fled and Martel's troops gathered the spoils of the camp. Martel's reputation increased considerably as a result, and he attracted more followers. This battle is often considered by historians as the turning point in Charles's struggle.

Battle of Vincy 

Richard Gerberding points out that up to this time, much of Martel's support was probably from his mother's kindred in the lands around Liege. After Amblève, he seems to have won the backing of the influential Willibrord, founder of the Abbey of Echternach. The abbey had been built on land donated by Plectrude's mother, Irmina of Oeren, but most of Willibrord's missionary work had been carried out in Frisia. In joining Chilperic and Ragenfrid, Radbod of Frisia sacked Utrecht, burning churches and killing many missionaries. Willibrord and his monks were forced to flee to Echternach. Gerberding suggests that Willibrord had decided that the chances of preserving his life's work were better with a successful field commander like Martel than with Plectrude in Cologne. Willibrord subsequently baptized Martel's son Pepin. Gerberding suggests a likely date of Easter 716. Martel also received support from bishop Pepo of Verdun.

Charles took time to rally more men and prepare. By the following spring, Charles had attracted enough support to invade Neustria. Charles sent an envoy who proposed a cessation of hostilities if Chilperic would recognize his rights as mayor of the palace in Austrasia. The refusal was not unexpected but served to impress upon Martel's forces the unreasonableness of the Neustrians. They met near Cambrai at the Battle of Vincy on 21 March 717. The victorious Martel pursued the fleeing king and mayor to Paris, but as he was not yet prepared to hold the city, he turned back to deal with Plectrude and Cologne. He took the city and dispersed her adherents. Plectrude was allowed to retire to a convent. Theudoald lived to 741 under his uncle's protection, a kindness unusual for those times, when mercy to a former gaoler, or a potential rival, was rare.

Consolidation of power 
Upon this success, Charles proclaimed Chlothar IV king of Austrasia in opposition to Chilperic and deposed Rigobert, archbishop of Reims, replacing him with Milo, a lifelong supporter.

In 718, Chilperic responded to Charles' new ascendancy by making an alliance with Odo the Great (or Eudes, as he is sometimes known), the duke of Aquitaine, who had become independent during the civil war in 715, but was again defeated, at the Battle of Soissons, by Charles. Chilperic fled with his ducal ally to the land south of the Loire and Ragenfrid fled to Angers. Soon Chlotar IV died and Odo surrendered King Chilperic in exchange for Charles recognizing his dukedom. Charles recognized Chilperic as king of the Franks in return for legitimate royal affirmation of his own mayoralty over all the kingdoms.

Wars of 718–732 

Between 718 and 732, Charles secured his power through a series of victories. Having unified the Franks under his banner, Charles was determined to punish the Saxons who had invaded Austrasia. Therefore, late in 718, he laid waste their country to the banks of the Weser, the Lippe, and the Ruhr. He defeated them in the Teutoburg Forest and thus secured the Frankish border in the name of King Chlotaire.

When the Frisian leader Radbod died in 719, Charles seized West Frisia without any great resistance on the part of the Frisians, who had been subjected to the Franks but had rebelled upon the death of Pippin. When Chilperic II died in 721, Charles appointed as his successor the son of Dagobert III, Theuderic IV, who was still a minor, and who occupied the throne from 721 to 737. Charles was now appointing the kings whom he supposedly served (rois fainéants) although they were mere figureheads. By the end of his reign, he didn't appoint any at all. At this time, Charles again marched against the Saxons. Then the Neustrians rebelled under Ragenfrid, who had left the county of Anjou. They were easily defeated in 724 but Ragenfrid gave up his sons as hostages in turn for keeping his county. This ended the civil wars of Charles' reign.

The next six years were devoted in their entirety to assuring Frankish authority over the neighboring political groups. Between 720 and 723, Charles was fighting in Bavaria, where the Agilolfing dukes had gradually evolved into independent rulers, recently in alliance with Liutprand the Lombard. He forced the Alemanni to accompany him, and Duke Hugbert submitted to Frankish suzerainty. In 725 he brought back the Agilolfing Princess Swanachild as a second wife.

In 725 and 728, he again entered Bavaria but, in 730, he marched against Lantfrid, Duke of Alemannia, who had also become independent, and killed him in battle. He forced the Alemanni to capitulate to Frankish suzerainty and did not appoint a successor to Lantfrid. Thus, southern Germany once more became part of the Frankish kingdom, as had northern Germany during the first years of the reign.

Aquitaine and the Battle of Tours in 732 

In 731, after defeating the Saxons, Charles turned his attention to the rival southern realm of Aquitaine, and crossed the Loire, breaking the treaty with Duke Odo. The Franks ransacked Aquitaine twice, and captured Bourges, although Odo retook it. The Continuations of Fredegar allege that Odo called on assistance from the recently established emirate of al-Andalus, but there had been Arab raids into Aquitaine from the 720s onwards. Indeed, the anonymous Chronicle of 754 records a victory for Odo in 721 at the Battle of Toulouse, while the Liber Pontificalis records that Odo had killed 375,000 Saracens. It is more likely that this invasion or raid took place in revenge for Odo's support for a rebel Berber leader named Munnuza.

Whatever the precise circumstances were, it is clear that an army under the leadership of Abd al-Rahman al-Ghafiqi headed north, and after some minor engagements marched on the wealthy city of Tours. According to British medieval historian Paul Fouracre, "Their campaign should perhaps be interpreted as a long-distance raid rather than the beginning of a war". They were, however, defeated by the army of Charles at the Battle of Tours (known in France as the Battle of Poitiers), at a location between the French cities of Tours and Poitiers, in a victory described by the Continuations of Fredegar. According to the historian Bernard Bachrach, the Arab army, mostly mounted, failed to break through the Frankish infantry. News of this battle spread, and may be recorded in Bede's Ecclesiastical History (Book V, ch. 23). However, it is not given prominence in Arabic sources from the period.

Despite his victory, Charles did not gain full control of Aquitaine, and Odo remained duke until 735.

Wars of 732–737 

Between his victory of 732 and 735, Charles reorganized the kingdom of Burgundy, replacing the counts and dukes with his loyal supporters, thus strengthening his hold on power. He was forced, by the ventures of Bubo, Duke of the Frisians, to invade independent-minded Frisia again in 734. In that year, he slew the duke at the Battle of the Boarn. Charles ordered the Frisian pagan shrines destroyed, and so wholly subjugated the populace that the region was peaceful for twenty years after.

In 735, Duke Odo of Aquitaine died. Though Charles wished to rule the duchy directly and went there to elicit the submission of the Aquitanians, the aristocracy proclaimed Odo's son, Hunald I of Aquitaine, as duke, and Charles and Hunald eventually recognised each other's position.

Interregnum (737–741) 
In 737, at the tail end of his campaigning in Provence and Septimania, the Merovingian king, Theuderic IV, died. Charles, titling himself maior domus and princeps et dux Francorum, did not appoint a new king and nobody acclaimed one. The throne lay vacant until Charles' death. The interregnum, the final four years of Charles' life, was relatively peaceful although in 738 he compelled the Saxons of Westphalia to submit and pay tribute and in 739 he checked an uprising in Provence where some rebels united under the leadership of Maurontus.

Charles used the relative peace to set about integrating the outlying realms of his empire into the Frankish church. He erected four dioceses in Bavaria (Salzburg, Regensburg, Freising, and Passau) and gave them Boniface as archbishop and metropolitan over all Germany east of the Rhine, with his seat at Mainz. Boniface had been under his protection from 723 on. Indeed, the saint himself explained to his old friend, Daniel of Winchester, that without it he could neither administer his church, defend his clergy nor prevent idolatry.

In 739, Pope Gregory III begged Charles for his aid against Liutprand, but Charles was loath to fight his onetime ally and ignored the plea. Nonetheless, the pope's request for Frankish protection showed how far Charles had come from the days when he was tottering on excommunication, and set the stage for his son and grandson to assert themselves in the peninsula.

Death and transition in rule 

Charles Martel died on 22 October 741, at Quierzy-sur-Oise in what is today the Aisne département in the Picardy region of France. He was buried at Saint Denis Basilica in Paris.

His territories had been divided among his adult sons a year earlier: to Carloman he gave Austrasia, Alemannia, and Thuringia, and to Pippin the Younger Neustria, Burgundy, Provence, and Metz and Trier in the "Mosel duchy". Grifo was given several lands throughout the kingdom, but at a later date, just before Charles died.

Legacy 
Earlier in his life Charles Martel had many internal opponents and felt the need to appoint his own kingly claimant, Chlotar IV. Later, however, the dynamics of rulership in Francia had changed, and no hallowed Merovingian ruler was required. Charles divided his realm among his sons without opposition (though he ignored his young son Bernard). For many historians, Charles Martel laid the foundations for his son Pepin's rise to the Frankish throne in 751, and his grandson Charlemagne's imperial acclamation in 800. However, for Paul Fouracre, while Charles was "the most effective military leader in Francia", his career "finished on a note of unfinished business".

Family and children
Charles Martel married twice, his first wife being Rotrude of Treves, daughter either of Lambert II, Count of Hesbaye, or of Leudwinus, Count of Treves. They had the following children:
 Hiltrud
 Carloman
 Landrade, also rendered as Landres
 Auda, also called Aldana or Alane
 Pepin the Short, also called Pippin.

Most of the children married and had issue. Hiltrud married Odilo I (Duke of Bavaria). Landrade was once believed to have married a Sigrand (Count of Hesbania) but Sigrand's wife was more likely the sister of Rotrude. Auda married Thierry IV (Count of Autun and Toulouse).

Charles also married a second time, to Swanhild and they had a child named Grifo.

Charles Martel also had a known mistress, Ruodhaid, with whom he had:
 Bernhard (–787),
 Hieronymus (- after 782),
 Remigius (d. 771) archbishop of Rouen.

Reputation and historiography

Military victories 
For early medieval authors, Charles Martel was famous for his military victories. Paul the Deacon for instance attributed a victory against the Saracens actually won by Odo of Aquitaine to Charles. However, alongside this there soon developed a darker reputation, for his alleged abuse of church property. A ninth-century text, the Visio Eucherii, possibly written by Hincmar of Reims, portrayed Martel as suffering in hell for this reason. According to British medieval historian Paul Fouracre, this was "the single most important text in the construction of Charles Martel's reputation as a seculariser or despoiler of church lands".

By the eighteenth century, historians such as Edward Gibbon had begun to portray the Frankish leader as the saviour of Christian Europe from a full-scale Islamic invasion. In Gibbon's The Decline And Fall Of The Roman Empire he wonders whether without Charles' victory, "Perhaps the interpretation of the Koran would now be taught in the schools of Oxford".

In the nineteenth century, the German historian Heinrich Brunner argued that Charles had confiscated church lands in order to fund military reforms that allowed him to defeat the Arab conquests, in this way brilliantly combining two traditions about the ruler. However, Fouracre argued that "...there is not enough evidence to show that there was a decisive change either in the way in which the Franks fought, or in the way in which they organised the resources needed to support their warriors."

Many twentieth-century European historians continued to develop Gibbon's perspectives, such as French medievalist Christian Pfister, who wrote in 1911 that

Similarly, William E. Watson, who wrote of the battle's importance in Frankish and world history in 1993, suggested that

And in 1993, the influential political scientist Samuel Huntington saw the battle of Tours as marking the end of the "Arab and Moorish surge west and north".

Other recent historians, however, argue that the importance of the battle is dramatically overstated, both for European history in general and for Charles Martel's reign in particular. This view is typified by Alessandro Barbero, who in 2004 wrote,

Similarly, in 2002 Tomaž Mastnak wrote: 

More recently, the memory of Charles Martel has been appropriated by far right and white nationalist groups, such as the 'Charles Martel Group' in France, and by Australian Brenton Harrison Tarrant, the perpetrator of the Christchurch mosque shootings at Al Noor Mosque and Linwood Islamic Centre in Christchurch, New Zealand, in 2019. The memory of Charles Martel is a topic of debate in contemporary French politics on both the right and the left.

Order of the Genet 
In the seventeenth century, a legend emerged that Charles Martel had formed the first regular order of knights in France. In 1620, Andre Favyn stated (without providing a source) that among the spoils Charles Martel's forces captured after the Battle of Tours were many genets (raised for their fur) and several of their pelts. Charles Martel gave these furs to leaders amongst his army, forming the first order of knighthood, the Order of the Genet. Favyn's claim was then repeated and elaborated in later works in English, for instance by Elias Ashmole in 1672, and James Coats in 1725.

References

External links 

 Ian Meadows, "The Arabs in Occitania": A sketch giving the context of the conflict from the Arab point of view.
 https://web.archive.org/web/20051222052229/http://www.standin.se/fifteen07a.htm Poke's edition of Creasy's "15 Most Important Battles Ever Fought According to Edward Shepherd Creasy" Chapter VII. The Battle of Tours, A.D. 732.
 Richard Hooker, "Civil War and the Umayyads"
 "Leaders and Battles Database"
 'The Battle of Tours', BBC Radio 4 In Our Time (2014)
 Robert W. Martin, "The Battle of Tours is still felt today", from About.com
 Medieval Sourcebook: Arabs, Franks, and the Battle of Tours, 732
 Arabs, Franks, and the Battle of Tours, 732: Three Accounts from the Internet Medieval Sourcebook
 Medieval Sourcebook: Gregory II to Charles Martel, 739
 Medieval Lands Project: Franks, Merovingian Nobility
 

Carolingian dynasty
Frankish warriors
Christian monarchs
Mayors of the Palace
7th-century births
741 deaths
Year of birth uncertain 
Burials at the Basilica of Saint-Denis
People from Herstal
7th-century Frankish nobility
8th-century Frankish nobility
8th-century rulers in Europe